Paw Paw Building, also known as Odd Fellows Hall, is a historic building located at Port Deposit, Cecil County, Maryland. It is a two-story, stone structure covered with plaster, that was built in 1821 by the First Methodist Episcopal congregation.  It was used as a church until 1839.  It was then used as a school called Heath of Health Academy and later Odd Fellows Academy.  It later held a grocery store and "dining salon" until converted for use as an apartment and recreation hall.

It was listed on the National Register of Historic Places in 1977.

References

External links
, including photo from 2000, at Maryland Historical Trust

Buildings and structures in Cecil County, Maryland
Clubhouses on the National Register of Historic Places in Maryland
Religious buildings and structures completed in 1821
National Register of Historic Places in Cecil County, Maryland